Gnophini is a tribe of moths.

Taxonomy
Gnophini contains the following genera:

References

Taxa described in 1845
Ennominae
Taxa named by Philogène Auguste Joseph Duponchel
Lepidoptera tribes